Lily Dulany Emmet Cushing (1909–1969) was an American artist. Her work is included in the collections of the Smithsonian American Art Museum and the Museum of Modern Art, New York. Her personal papers are held by the Smithsonian's Archives of American Art.

References

1909 births
1969 deaths
Painters from New York City
20th-century American women artists
20th-century American painters
American women painters
Cushing family